The thorium fuel cycle is a nuclear fuel cycle that uses an isotope of thorium, as the fertile material. In the reactor,  is transmuted into the fissile artificial uranium isotope  which is the nuclear fuel. Unlike natural uranium, natural thorium contains only trace amounts of fissile material (such as ), which are insufficient to initiate a nuclear chain reaction. Additional fissile material or another neutron source is necessary to initiate the fuel cycle. In a thorium-fuelled reactor,  absorbs neutrons to produce . This parallels the process in uranium breeder reactors whereby fertile  absorbs neutrons to form fissile . Depending on the design of the reactor and fuel cycle, the generated  either fissions in situ or is chemically separated from the used nuclear fuel and formed into new nuclear fuel.

The thorium fuel cycle has several potential advantages over a uranium fuel cycle, including thorium's greater abundance, superior physical and nuclear properties, reduced plutonium and actinide production, and better resistance to nuclear weapons proliferation when used in a traditional light water reactor though not in a molten salt reactor.

History
Concerns about the limits of worldwide uranium resources motivated initial interest in the thorium fuel cycle.  It was envisioned that as uranium reserves were depleted, thorium would supplement uranium as a fertile material. However, for most countries uranium was relatively abundant and research in thorium fuel cycles waned. A notable exception was India's three-stage nuclear power programme.
In the twenty-first century thorium's claimed potential for improving proliferation resistance and waste characteristics led to renewed interest in the thorium fuel cycle. While thorium is more abundant in the continental crust than uranium and easily extracted from monazite as a side product of rare earth element mining, it is much less abundant in seawater than uranium.

At Oak Ridge National Laboratory in the 1960s, the Molten-Salt Reactor Experiment used  as the fissile fuel in an experiment to demonstrate a part of the Molten Salt Breeder Reactor that was designed to operate on the thorium fuel cycle.  Molten salt reactor (MSR) experiments assessed thorium's feasibility, using thorium(IV) fluoride dissolved in a molten salt fluid that eliminated the need to fabricate fuel elements. The MSR program was defunded in 1976 after its patron Alvin Weinberg was fired.

In 1993, Carlo Rubbia proposed the concept of an energy amplifier or "accelerator driven system" (ADS), which he saw as a novel and safe way to produce nuclear energy that exploited existing accelerator technologies. Rubbia's proposal offered the potential to incinerate high-activity nuclear waste and produce energy from natural thorium and depleted uranium.

Kirk Sorensen, former NASA scientist and Chief Technologist at Flibe Energy, has been a long-time promoter of thorium fuel cycle and particularly liquid fluoride thorium reactors (LFTRs). He first researched thorium reactors while working at NASA, while evaluating power plant designs suitable for lunar colonies. In 2006 Sorensen started "energyfromthorium.com" to promote and make information available about this technology.

A 2011 MIT study concluded that although there is little in the way of barriers to a thorium fuel cycle, with current or near term light-water reactor designs there is also little incentive for any significant market penetration to occur. As such they conclude there is little chance of thorium cycles replacing conventional uranium cycles in the current nuclear power market, despite the potential benefits.

Nuclear reactions with thorium
In the thorium cycle, fuel is formed when  captures a neutron (whether in a fast reactor or thermal reactor) to become . This normally emits an electron and an anti-neutrino by  decay to become . This then emits another electron and anti-neutrino by a second  decay to become , the fuel:

\overset{neutron}{n}+{^{232}_{90}Th} -> {^{233}_{90}Th} ->[\beta^-] {^{233}_{91}Pa} ->[\beta^-] \overset{fuel}{^{233}_{92}U}

Fission product waste
Nuclear fission produces radioactive fission products which can have half-lives from days to greater than 200,000 years. According to some toxicity studies, the thorium cycle can fully recycle actinide wastes and only emit fission product wastes, and after a few hundred years, the waste from a thorium reactor can be less toxic than the uranium ore that would have been used to produce low enriched uranium fuel for a light water reactor of the same power.
Other studies assume some actinide losses and find that actinide wastes dominate thorium cycle waste radioactivity at some future periods. Some fission products have been proposed for nuclear transmutation, which would further reduce the amount of nuclear waste and the duration during which it would have to be stored (whether in a deep geological repository or elsewhere). However, while the principal feasibility of some of those reactions has been demonstrated at laboratory scale, there is as of 2022 no large scale deliberate transmutation of fission products anywhere in the world and the upcoming MYRRHA research project into transmutation is mostly focused on transuranic waste. Furthermore, the cross section of some fission products is relatively low and others - such as Caesium - are present as a mixture of stable, short lived and long lived isotopes in nuclear waste, making transmutation dependent on extremely expensive isotope separation.

Actinide waste
In a reactor, when a neutron hits a fissile atom (such as certain isotopes of uranium), it either splits the nucleus or is captured and transmutes the atom. When  absorbs a neutron, it either fissions or becomes . The result is less transuranic waste than in a reactor using the uranium-plutonium fuel cycle.

, like most actinides with an even number of neutrons, is not fissile, but neutron capture produces fissile . The  can be removed and stored as waste or retained and transmuted to plutonium, where more of it fissions, while the remainder becomes , then americium and curium, which in turn can be removed as waste or returned to reactors for further transmutation and fission.

Uranium-232 contamination

The full decay chain, along with half-lives and relevant gamma energies, is:
 decays to  where it joins the decay chain of 

The contamination could also be avoided by using a molten-salt breeder reactor and separating the  before it decays into . The hard gamma emissions also create a radiological hazard which requires remote handling during reprocessing.

Nuclear fuel

Advantages
The primary physical advantage of thorium fuel is that it uniquely makes possible a breeder reactor that runs with slow neutrons, otherwise known as a thermal breeder reactor. These reactors are often considered simpler than the more traditional fast-neutron breeders.

Thorium is estimated to be about three to four times more abundant than uranium in Earth's crust, although present knowledge of reserves is limited. Current demand for thorium has been satisfied as a by-product of rare-earth extraction from monazite sands. Notably, there is very little thorium dissolved in seawater, so seawater extraction is not viable, as it is with uranium. Using breeder reactors, known thorium and uranium resources can both generate world-scale energy for thousands of years.

Thorium-based fuels also display favorable physical and chemical properties that improve reactor and repository performance. Compared to the predominant reactor fuel, uranium dioxide, thorium dioxide has a higher melting point, higher thermal conductivity, and lower coefficient of thermal expansion. Thorium dioxide also exhibits greater chemical stability and, unlike uranium dioxide, does not further oxidize.

These high-energy photons are a radiological hazard that necessitate the use of remote handling of separated uranium and aid in the passive detection of such materials.

Because of this, thorium is a potentially attractive alternative to uranium in mixed oxide (MOX) fuels to minimize the generation of transuranics and maximize the destruction of plutonium.

Disadvantages
There are several challenges to the application of thorium as a nuclear fuel, particularly for solid fuel reactors:

In contrast to uranium, naturally occurring thorium is effectively mononuclidic and contains no fissile isotopes; fissile material, generally ,  or plutonium, must be added to achieve criticality. This, along with the high sintering temperature necessary to make thorium-dioxide fuel, complicates fuel fabrication. Oak Ridge National Laboratory experimented with thorium tetrafluoride as fuel in a molten salt reactor from 1964 to 1969, which was expected to be easier to process and separate from contaminants that slow or stop the chain reaction.

In an open fuel cycle (i.e. utilizing  in situ), higher burnup is necessary to achieve a favorable neutron economy. Although thorium dioxide performed well at burnups of 170,000 MWd/t and 150,000 MWd/t at Fort St. Vrain Generating Station and AVR respectively, challenges complicate achieving this in light water reactors (LWR), which compose the vast majority of existing power reactors.

In a once-through thorium fuel cycle, thorium-based fuels produce far less long-lived transuranics than uranium-based fuels,
On a closed cycle, and  can be reprocessed.  is also considered an excellent burnable poison absorber in light water reactors.

As a result, substantial  develops in thorium-based fuels.  is a significant neutron absorber and, although it eventually breeds into fissile , this requires two more neutron absorptions, which degrades neutron economy and increases the likelihood of transuranic production.

Further, unlike proven uranium fuel recycling technology (e.g. PUREX), recycling technology for thorium (e.g. THOREX) is only under development.

Although the presence of  complicates matters, there are public documents showing that  has been used once in a nuclear weapon test. The United States tested a composite -plutonium bomb core in the MET (Military Effects Test) blast during Operation Teapot in 1955, though with much lower yield than expected.

Advocates for liquid core and molten salt reactors such as LFTRs claim that these technologies negate thorium's disadvantages present in solid fuelled reactors. As only two liquid-core fluoride salt reactors have been built (the ORNL ARE and MSRE) and neither have used thorium, it is hard to validate the exact benefits.

Thorium-fueled reactors

Thorium fuels have fueled several different reactor types, including light water reactors, heavy water reactors, high temperature gas reactors, sodium-cooled fast reactors, and molten salt reactors.

List of thorium-fueled reactors

From IAEA TECDOC-1450 "Thorium Fuel Cycle – Potential Benefits and Challenges", Table 1: Thorium utilization in different experimental and power reactors. Additionally from Energy Information Administration, "Spent Nuclear Fuel Discharges from U. S. Reactors", Table B4: Dresden 1 Assembly Class.

See also
 

Thorium
Thorium-232
Occurrence of thorium
Thorium-based nuclear power
List of countries by thorium resources
List of countries by uranium reserves
Advanced heavy-water reactor
Alvin Radkowsky
CANDU reactor
Fuji MSR
Peak uranium
Radioactive waste
Thorium Energy Alliance
Weinberg Foundation
World energy resources and consumption

References

Further reading
 Kasten, P. R. (1998). "Review of the Radkowsky Thorium reactor concept" Science & Global Security, 7(3), 237–269.
 Duncan Clark (9 September 2011), "Thorium advocates launch pressure group. Huge optimism for thorium nuclear energy at the launch of the Weinberg Foundation", The Guardian
 
 B.D. Kuz'minov, V.N. Manokhin, (1998) "Status of nuclear data for the thorium fuel cycle", IAEA translation from the Russian journal Yadernye Konstanty (Nuclear Constants) Issue No. 3–4, 1997
 Thorium and uranium fuel cycles comparison by the UK National Nuclear Laboratory
 Fact sheet on thorium  at the World Nuclear Association.
 Annotated bibliography for the thorium fuel cycle from the Alsos Digital Library for Nuclear Issues

External links
 International Thorium Energy Committee

Nuclear chemistry
Nuclear fuels
Nuclear reprocessing
Nuclear technology
Actinides
Thorium